The kelvin, symbol K, is the primary unit of temperature in the International System of Units (SI), used alongside its prefixed forms and the degree Celsius. It is named after the Belfast-born and University of Glasgow-based engineer and physicist William Thomson, 1st Baron Kelvin (1824–1907). The Kelvin scale is an absolute thermodynamic temperature scale, meaning it uses absolute zero as its zero point.

Historically, the Kelvin scale was developed by shifting the starting point of the much-older Celsius scale down from the melting point of ice to absolute zero, and its increments still closely approximate the historic definition of a degree Celsius, but since 2019 the scale has been defined by fixing the Boltzmann constant  to be exactly .

The kelvin is the primary unit of temperature for engineering and the physical sciences, while in most countries Celsius remains the dominant scale outside of these fields. In the United States, outside of the physical sciences the Fahrenheit scale predominates, with the kelvin or Rankine scale employed for absolute temperature. Those are defined using the kelvin.

According to SI convention, the kelvin is never referred to nor written as a degree. The word "kelvin" is not capitalised when used as a unit, but is pluralised as appropriate. The unit symbol K is a capital letter. For example, "It is 50 degrees Fahrenheit outside" vs "It is 10 degrees Celsius outside" vs "It is 283 kelvins outside". It is common convention to capitalize the term when referring to the Kelvin scale.

History

Precursors 

During the 18th century, multiple temperature scales were developed, notably Fahrenheit and centigrade (later Celsius). These scales predated much of the modern science of thermodynamics, including atomic theory and the kinetic theory of gases which underpin the concept of absolute zero. Instead, they chose defining points within the range of human experience that could be reproduced easily and with reasonable accuracy, but lacked any deep significance in thermal physics. In the case of the Celsius scale (and the long since defunct Newton scale and Réaumur scale) the melting point of water served as such a starting point, with Celsius being defined, from the 1740s up until the 1940s, by calibrating a thermometer such that:

 The freezing point of water is 0 degrees.
 The boiling point of water is 100 degrees.

This definition assumes pure water at a specific pressure chosen to approximate the natural air pressure at sea level. Thus an increment of 1 °C  equals  of the temperature difference between the melting and boiling points. This temperature interval would go on to become the template for the kelvin.

Charles's law 
From 1787 to 1802, it was determined by Jacques Charles (unpublished), John Dalton, and Joseph Louis Gay-Lussac that, at constant pressure, ideal gases expanded or contracted their volume linearly (Charles's law) by about 1/273 parts per degree Celsius of temperature's change up or down, between 0° and 100° C. This suggested that the volume of a gas cooled at about −273 °C would reach zero.

Lord Kelvin 

In 1848, William Thomson, who was later ennobled as Lord Kelvin, published a paper On an Absolute Thermometric Scale. Using the soon-to-be-defunct caloric theory, he proposed an "absolute" scale based on the following parameters:

 The melting point of water is 0 degrees.
 The boiling point of water is 100 degrees.

"The arbitrary points which coincide on the two scales are 0° and 100°"

 Any two heat engines whose heat source and heat sink are both separated by the same number of degrees will, per Carnot's theorem, be capable of producing the same amount of mechanical work per unit of "caloric" passing through.

"The characteristic property of the scale which I now propose is, that all degrees have the same value; that is, that a unit of heat descending from a body  at the temperature ° of this scale, to a body  at the temperature ( − 1)°, would give out the same mechanical effect, whatever be the number . This may justly be termed an absolute scale, since its characteristic is quite independent of the physical properties of any specific substance."

As Carnot's theorem is understood in modern thermodynamics to simply describe the maximum efficiency with which thermal energy can be converted to mechanical energy and the predicted maximum efficiency is a function of the ratio between the absolute temperatures of the heat source and heat sink:

Efficiency ≤ 1 − 

It follows that increments of equal numbers of degrees on this scale must always represent equal proportional increases in absolute temperature. The numerical value of an absolute temperature, on the 1848 scale is related to the absolute temperature of the melting point of water, and the absolute temperature of the boiling point of water, by:

  (1848 scale) = 100 /

On this scale, an increase of 222 degrees always means an approximate doubling of absolute temperature regardless of the starting temperature.

In a footnote Thomson calculated that "infinite cold" (absolute zero, which would have a numerical value of negative infinity on this scale) was equivalent to −273 °C using the air thermometers of the time. This value of "−273" was the negative reciprocal of 0.00366—the accepted coefficient of thermal expansion of an ideal gas per degree Celsius relative to the ice point, giving a remarkable consistency to the currently accepted value.

Within a decade, Thomson had abandoned caloric theory and superseded the 1848 scale with a new one based on the 2 features that would characterise all future versions of the kelvin scale:

 Absolute zero is the null point.
 Increments have the same magnitude as they do in the Celsius scale.

In 1892, Thomson was awarded the noble title 1st Baron Kelvin of Largs, or more succinctly Lord Kelvin. This name was a reference to the River Kelvin which flows through the grounds of Glasgow University.

In the early decades of the 20th century, the Kelvin scale was often called the "absolute Celsius" scale, indicating Celsius degrees counted from absolute zero rather than the freezing point of water, and using the same symbol for regular Celsius degrees, °C.

Triple point standard 

In 1873, William Thomson's older brother James coined the term triple point to describe the combination of temperature and pressure at which the solid, liquid, and gas phases of a substance were capable of coexisting in thermodynamic equilibrium. While any two phases could coexist along a range of temperature-pressure combinations (e.g. the boiling point of water can be affected quite dramatically by raising or lowering the pressure), the triple point condition for a given substance can occur only at a single pressure and only at a single temperature. By the 1940s, the triple point of water had been experimentally measured to be about 0.6% of standard atmospheric pressure and very close to 0.01 °C per the historical definition of Celsius then in use.

In 1948, the Celsius scale was recalibrated by assigning the triple point temperature of water the value of 0.01 °C exactly and allowing the melting point at standard atmospheric pressure to have an empirically determined value (and the actual melting point at ambient pressure to have a fluctuating value) close to 0 °C. This was justified on the grounds that the triple point was judged to give a more accurately reproducible reference temperature than the melting point.

In 1954, with absolute zero having been experimentally determined to be about −273.15 °C per the definition of °C then in use, Resolution 3 of the 10th General Conference on Weights and Measures (CGPM) introduced a new internationally standardised Kelvin scale which defined the triple point as exactly: 273.15 + 0.01 = 273.16 "degrees Kelvin".

In 1967/1968, Resolution 3 of the 13th CGPM renamed the unit increment of thermodynamic temperature "kelvin", symbol K, replacing "degree Kelvin", symbol °K. The 13th CGPM also held in Resolution 4 that "The kelvin, unit of thermodynamic temperature, is equal to the fraction  of the thermodynamic temperature of the triple point of water."

After the 1983 redefinition of the metre, this left the kelvin, the second, and the kilogram as the only SI units not defined with reference to any other unit.

In 2005, noting that the triple point could be influenced by the isotopic ratio of the hydrogen and oxygen making up a water sample and that this was "now one of the major sources of the observed variability between different realizations of the water triple point", the International Committee for Weights and Measures (CIPM), a committee of the CGPM, affirmed that for the purposes of delineating the temperature of the triple point of water, the definition of the kelvin would refer to water having the isotopic composition specified for Vienna Standard Mean Ocean Water.

2019 redefinition 

In 2005, the CIPM began a programme to redefine the kelvin (along with the other SI units) using a more experimentally rigorous method. In particular, the committee proposed redefining the kelvin such that the Boltzmann constant takes the exact value . The committee had hoped that the program would be completed in time for its adoption by the CGPM at its 2011 meeting, but at the 2011 meeting the decision was postponed to the 2014 meeting when it would be considered as part of a larger program.

The redefinition was further postponed in 2014, pending more accurate measurements of the Boltzmann constant in terms of the current definition,
but was finally adopted at the 26th CGPM in late 2018, with a value of  = 

For scientific purposes, the main advantage is that this allows measurements at very low and very high temperatures to be made more accurately, as the techniques used depend on the Boltzmann constant.  It also has the philosophical advantage of being independent of any particular substance. The unit J/K is equal to kg⋅m2⋅s−2⋅K−1, where the kilogram, metre and second are defined in terms of the Planck constant, the speed of light, and the duration of the caesium-133 ground-state hyperfine transition respectively. Thus, this definition depends only on universal constants, and not on any physical artifacts as practiced previously. The challenge was to avoid degrading the accuracy of measurements close to the triple point.  For practical purposes, the redefinition was unnoticed; water still freezes at 273.15 K (0 °C), and the triple point of water continues to be a commonly used laboratory reference temperature.

Afterward, the Boltzmann constant is exact and the uncertainty is transferred to the triple point of water, which is now .

The new definition officially came into force on 20 May 2019, the 144th anniversary of the Metre Convention.

Practical uses

Colour temperature

The kelvin is often used as a measure of the colour temperature of light sources. Colour temperature is based upon the principle that a black body radiator emits light with a frequency distribution characteristic of its temperature. Black bodies at temperatures below about  appear reddish, whereas those above about  appear bluish. In astronomy, the stellar classification of stars and their place on the Hertzsprung–Russell diagram are based, in part, upon their surface temperature, known as effective temperature.

Digital cameras and photographic software often use colour temperature in K in edit and setup menus. The simple guide is that higher colour temperature produces an image with enhanced white and blue hues. The reduction in colour temperature produces an image more dominated by reddish, "warmer" colours.

Kelvin as a unit of noise temperature

For electronics, the kelvin is used as an indicator of how noisy a circuit is in relation to an ultimate noise floor, i.e. the noise temperature. The so-called Johnson–Nyquist noise of discrete resistors and capacitors is a type of thermal noise derived from the Boltzmann constant and can be used to determine the noise temperature of a circuit using the Friis formulas for noise.

Derived units and SI multiples

The only SI derived unit with a special name derived from the kelvin is the degree Celsius. Like other SI units, the kelvin can also be modified by adding a metric prefix that multiplies it by a power of 10:

Unicode character 
The symbol is encoded in Unicode at code point . However, this is a compatibility character provided for compatibility with legacy encodings. In all three instances, the regular letter should be used."

See also

 Comparison of temperature scales
 International Temperature Scale of 1990
 Negative temperature

References

Bibliography

External links

1848 introductions
Scottish inventions
SI base units
William Thomson, 1st Baron Kelvin
Scales of temperature
Scales in meteorology